Agatu is a Local Government Area of Benue State, North Central Nigeria. It was created in 1996. It used to be the Agatu district of the old Otukpo division. The headquarters of the local government is at Obagaji; it is one of nine local government areas in the southern senatorial zone of Benue State which is mainly occupied by the Idoma people of Benue State. The resident population are mainly farmers.

On 21 Jan 2014, 20 civilians and 5 soldiers were killed in an Agatu in an attack by Fulani herdsmen.

Agatu was the scene of more attacks over two years later, in 2016.

Agatu is a home to notable people such as Hon John Ngbede current deputy Governor of Benue State, Hon Solomon Agidani former House of Rep member and Professor Isa Innocent Ekoja first professor from Agatu, Pastor John Eliagwu Odogbo current Ochidoma of Idoma

References

Populated places established in 1991
Local Government Areas in Benue State
1991 establishments in Nigeria